Nalobin is a Russian surname. Notable people with the surname include:

 Sergey Nalobin (born 1979), Russian diplomat
 Alexey Nalobin (born 1989), Russian volleyball player

Russian-language surnames